Jujuy is a station on Line E of the Buenos Aires Underground.  From here, passengers may transfer to Humberto I station on Line H. The station was opened on 20 June 1944 as part of the inaugural section of the line from San José to General Urquiza.

References

External links

Buenos Aires Underground stations